Antonello Crescenzio, known as Antonello da Palermo, who, according to De Marzo, was the son of Antonio Crescenzio, was born early in the 16th century, and practised both as a sculptor and a painter. He was an assistant to the sculptor Gagnino in 1527. In 1537 he completed two copies of Raphael's 'Spasimo;' one of
them is in the Carmelite Church at Palermo, and the other in the Monastery of Fazello, near Sciacca. The date of his death is uncertain.

Palermo, La Ganzia. Madonna and Child, dated 1528.

References
 

Year of birth unknown
Year of death unknown
16th-century Italian sculptors
Italian male sculptors
Italian Renaissance painters
16th-century Italian painters
Italian male painters
Artists from Palermo